Top-level rugby league in 2014 centred on Australasia's 2014 NRL Auckland Nines, 2014 NRL season and the Super League XIX. High-profile representative competitions included the 2014 Rugby League Four Nations (held in Australia and New Zealand) and the 2014 State of Origin series.

January

February
7: Super League XIX begins with the Huddersfield Giants upsetting last year's champions Wigan Warriors at the DW Stadium in Wigan.
14 & 15: Inaugural NRL Auckland Nines are held at Eden Park in Auckland, New Zealand. The North Queensland Cowboys are inaugural champions after beating Brisbane 16–7 in the final.
22: Sydney Roosters win the 2014 World Club Challenge after beating Wigan Warriors 36–14 at Allianz Stadium in Sydney, Australia.
25: Europe's Bradford Bulls team are deducted six Super League competition points after entering administration.

March
6: 2014 NRL season begins with the South Sydney Rabbitohs upsetting last year's champions Sydney Roosters at the ANZ Stadium in Sydney.

April

May
2: The 2014 ANZAC Test is played, with Australia defeating New Zealand 30–18 before 25,429 at Allianz Stadium.
3: The Pacific Rugby League International is played, with Samoa defeating Fiji 32–16 before 9,063 at Sportingbet Stadium in Penrith, Australia. In doing so they also secured qualification as the fourth and final team to compete at the 2014 Four Nations later in the year.
3: The City vs Country Origin is played, with City and Country drawing for only the second time since being 'Under origin selection rules'. The match finished 26 points apiece in front of a packed crowd at Dubbo's Apex Oval.
17 & 18: The Northern Hemisphere's Super League held its special Magic Weekend. The Magic Weekend was held at the City of Manchester Stadium in Manchester, England. It made several records such as attendance with Day 1 recording the biggest ever attendance with 36,339 fans attending the ground on one day. While the total aggregate attendance of 64,552 is the biggest ever attendance recorded for Super League's showcase weekend.

June
14: New South Wales made history, finally winning the State of Origin series after losing 8 consecutive. New South Wales won the historic third-match in the series 6–4 before 83,421 at ANZ Stadium in Sydney, New South Wales.

July
13: London Broncos are relegated from the Super League.
19: Canada have beaten Jamaica in the fourth annual Caribbean Carnival Cup.
27: Barrow Raiders are relegated from the Championship.

August
3: Swinton Lions are relegated from the Championship.
10: Rochdale Hornets are relegated from the Championship.
10: The lone Colonial Cup series match is played, with Canada making history and defeating USA 52–14 before 7,356 at Lamport Stadium to win their first ever Colonial Cup since the competition inaugurated in 2010.
11: North Wales Crusaders are relegated from the Championship.
23: The 2014 Challenge Cup final is played, with the Leeds Rhinos defeating the Castleford Tigers 23–10 before 77,914 at Wembley Stadium.

September
7 : Keighley Cougars are relegated from the Championship on a dramatic final day of the regular season. They finished just one point behind 8th placed Batley Bulldogs and 9th placed Whitehaven. 
12: Bradford Bulls are relegated from the Super League. They have been participating in the Super League since its inauguration in 1996 and have won four titles being 1997, 2001, 2003 and 2005.

October
5: 2014 NRL Grand Final is played and South Sydney are the new premiers after defeating the Canterbury Bulldogs 30–6 in front of a record 'Rectangular Shaped (ANZ) Stadium' crowd of 83,833 at ANZ Stadium in Sydney. This is also the Rabbitohs' first premiership title in 43 years
7: Hunslet Hawks win promotion to the Championship for the 2015 season.
11: 2014 Super League Grand Final is played and St. Helens are the new champions after defeating a '12-man' Wigan Warriors team 14–6 before 70,102 at Old Trafford in Strentford, England.
19: 2014 Hayne/Mannah Cup is played and Fiji are the champions after defeating Lebanon 40–28 at Remondis Stadium in Woolooware, New South Wales.

November
2: 2014 European Cup is won by Scotland for the first time. Scotland have therefore qualified to play alongside Australia, England and New Zealand in the 2016 Four Nations.
15: 2014 Four Nations Final is won by New Zealand who defeated Australia 22–18 before 25,093 at Westpac Stadium in Wellington, New Zealand.

December
19: New Zealand halfback, Shaun Johnson is announced as the best official player in 2014 after being awarded the Golden Boot.

Test Matches

ANZAC Test

Pacific Rugby League International

European Cup

2014 Four Nations

With the victory, New Zealand retained the Peter Leitch QSM Challenge Trophy

 
Sione Mata'utia made his international test début for Australia and becoming the youngest ever player to play for the 'Kangaroos' at age of 18 years and 129 days, eclipsing Israel Folau's seven-year-old record by 65 days.

Final

Other Test Match results

Regional Tournaments – Europe

Regional Tournaments – Asia/Middle East & The Atlantic

Trans-Continental

Domestic Competitions

Australasia

NRL Auckland Nines

The 2014 NRL Auckland Nines tournament will run over two days from 14 to 15 February 2014. All the matches are held at Auckland's Eden Park.

National Rugby League

The 2014 NRL Season will run from 6 March 2014 to 5 October 2014, with the latter date hosting the Grand Final at Sydney's ANZ Stadium.

State of Origin
2014 State of Origin series

Europe

Super League XIX

The Super League is the top club competition in Europe. In 2014 there are thirteen English teams and one French team in the 2014 season, known as Super League XIX with the bottom two teams on the table set to be relegated at the end of the regular season.

(* – Bradford Bulls deducted 6 points on 25 February 2014 for entering administration)

Carnegie Challenge Cup

The Rugby League Challenge Cup is the most prestigious knock-out competition in the world of Rugby League. It features teams from across Europe including England, Scotland, Wales, France and Russia.

The final of the 2014 Cup is held at the prestigious Wembley Stadium in London on 23 August.

Other competition results

Australia & Oceania

Europe

Africa

Asia & the Middle East

The Americas

See also

2014 New Zealand rugby league season

References

 
Rugby league by year